Mattfeldanthus is a genus of Brazilian flowering plants in Ironweed tribe within the sunflower family.

 Species
 Mattfeldanthus andrade-limae (G.M.Barroso) Dematt. - Pernambuco 
 Mattfeldanthus mutisioides H.Rob. & R.M.King - Bahia

References

Asteraceae genera
Endemic flora of Brazil
Vernonieae